is a Japanese light novel series written by Kana Akatsuki and illustrated by Akiko Takase. It was published by Kyoto Animation under their KA Esuma Bunko imprint, from December 2015 to March 2020. The story follows Violet Evergarden, a young ex-soldier whose recent employment at a postal company tasks her with writing letters that can connect people.

A 13-episode anime television series adaptation by Kyoto Animation aired between January and April 2018 with several advance screenings taking place in 2017. An original video animation episode was released in July 2018, and a spin-off film premiered in Japan in September 2019. A second anime film, Violet Evergarden: The Movie, premiered in September 2020.

In 2014, Violet Evergarden won the grand prize in the fifth Kyoto Animation Award's novel category.

Plot
There was a machine invented as a prototype for the typewriter, called Auto Memory Dolls. It was originally made by Professor Orlando, the authority on letterpress printing and a researcher of mechanical dolls. His wife, Molly, was a novelist, but she became blind and could not write anymore. Dr Orlando then created the first Auto-Memories Doll for her, meant to register everything said by a human voice. In the present time, the term refers to the industry of writing for others. The story follows Violet Evergarden's journey of reintegrating back into society after the war is over as she is no longer a soldier, and her search for her life's purpose in order to understand the last words her mentor and guardian, Major Gilbert, had said to her: "I love you."

Characters

Main characters
 
 
 Violet is a newcomer to the CH Postal Company, and works as an Auto Memory Doll—a ghostwriter for people who cannot write or are looking for help expressing their emotions in letters.
 As an abandoned and nameless child, Violet was found by navy officer Dietfried Bougainvillea on an island where he and several members of his crew were forced to land after a naval engagement. Her combat prowess was discovered when she killed several soldiers who attempted to molest her before he could stop them. Violet then stalked and killed all the other crew members. For reasons he did not understand, Violet spared Dietfried and obeyed his orders. Later, Dietfried brought Violet home and "gave" her to his brother Gilbert in the military as a gift for his promotion to major, intending for Gilbert to use her as a "tool" for war while not wanting to handle Violet himself. Gilbert instead treated her as a human, taught her how to speak, read, and write, and named her Violet, wishing she could grow up to be as beautiful as the flower. During the war, she repeatedly played a vital role in battles. Trying to save Gilbert in the war's decisive battle, she lost both her arms. With the war over, her arms were replaced with advanced metallic prosthetics, and she decided to become an Auto Memory Doll to learn the meaning of the words —Gilbert's last words to her before they became unconscious in the battlefield.
In the beginning, she was a girl who needed orders from others and had no sense of autonomy. Later, in the process of getting along with Gilbert, she slowly learned words, definitions, and meaning. During an outing, she received an emerald brooch that she considered as beautiful as Gilbert's eye color, and carried it with her all the time, guarding it as her master's proxy. For Violet, Gilbert is both special and irreplaceable.
 The light novel series (Vol. 1) explains elements of Violet's origin that have only been hinted at in the first season of the anime series. Violet's origins are entirely unknown. She is found on the island by Dietfried, but there is no indication of where she is from or how she got there and she has no memory of her life before meeting Dietfried. Dietfried shows Gilbert why Violet should only be a "weapon" by arranging for her to fight and kill five thieves and murderers he caught on his ship. Later, Gilbert shows the military Violet's skills by having her battle and kill ten death-row convicts in a military "training ground". The anime shows flashbacks to this latter incident without explaining it. Gilbert's special forces unit is used as cover and support for Violet's military activities. The novel also strongly hints that Violet may possess superhuman strength, but it is her remarkable skills at killing that are most notable.
 
 
 A major in the Leidenschaftlich Army, Gilbert came from an aristocratic family. Although he treasures Violet much more than anything else, he never expressed his feelings to her because of their identity as soldiers. It is his final words to her—"I love you"—that drive her to move forward on her new path as an Auto Memory Doll. The only memento of Gilbert that Violet has is an emerald brooch that reminds her of Gilbert's eyes. As he wanted Violet to live a life like a normal girl, instead of a tool, he told Claudia to announce that he is missing from the war and declared dead. However, he recovered from his injuries and lived in a rural place before meeting Violet several years later.

CH Postal Company

 
 A former army lieutenant colonel, Claudia is the president of the CH Postal Company. He was a good friend of Gilbert during their time in the military and Claudia attempts to help Violet take the first steps of her new life in order to absolve himself of his own guilt, stemming from Violet's treatment back in the military.

Cattleya is an Auto Memory Doll who works alongside Violet at the CH Postal Company as its most popular Doll. She has been close to Hodgins since before the company was established, and joined as one of its initial employees.

Benedict is a eccentric postman who works at the CH Postal Company. Alongside Cattleya, he maintained a close relationship with Hodgins before the company's establishment and eventually became one of its initial employees.

Erica is an Auto Memory Doll working at the CH Postal Company. Her skills when it comes to client interaction are poor, but she continues to believe in her work as a Doll, attributing it to the inspiration she found upon reading the novel written by Molly Orland, a blind novelist.

Iris is an Auto Memory Doll who started working at the CH Postal Company shortly after Erica was hired. Hailing from the small farming village of Kazaly, Iris has always admired the image of a working woman and has since aspired to become Leiden's most popular Auto Memory Doll.

Others

A navy captain and the older son of the Bougainvillea family, Dietfried is Gilbert's older brother. Though he was the one who first "gave" Violet to Gilbert, he treats Violet as a "tool" for war and resents her for the things she did to his men during the war. Dietfried also blames Gilbert's "death" on Violet, stating that she had failed to protect Gilbert as a tool for the war.

An Auto Memory Doll who first became friends with Violet during training school. She lives with her brother Spencer, a former soldier who has turned into a guilt-ridden drunk after failing to stop the death of their parents during the war.

The 14-year-old princess of the Kingdom of Drossel. Charlotte is betrothed to the prince of Flügel, Damian Baldur Flügel—a man who is 10 years older than her—in the pursuit of peace between the two kingdoms. Their relationship is openly declared for the public by exchanging love letters written by the Auto Memory Dolls. While she is genuinely in love with Damian, she thinks that her love isn't mutual. Sensing the other girl's apprehension, Violet hatches a scheme with her counterpart Doll, Cattleya (who is writing letters for the prince of Flügel) to have Charlotte and Damian write their own letters to each other, which has the effect of both strengthening their relationship and getting the people of both countries to wholeheartedly support the marriage.

A staff member working under the Shahar Observatory's Manuscript Division who was paired with Violet during a joint operation between the Observatory and a group of Auto Memory Dolls. Because of the circumstances behind his missing parents, he thinks that love causes people to become foolish.

A famous playwright who has become a drunk recluse after the loss of both his wife and daughter. Seeking to write his very first children's play and dedicate it to his daughter's memory, he entrusts Violet with the task of bringing his ideas to paper.

Clara's daughter, Anne is a young girl who loves dolls and initially thought that Violet is a life-size doll. Noticing her mother's worsening health, Anne believes that visitors take away her remaining time with her mother, not knowing Clara's real intentions for Anne.

Anne's mother, Clara has a terminal illness and predicts that her fate is close. Worried that her daughter will be all alone after her death, she requested Violet to write 50 letters for Anne that will be sent on her birthday for the next 50 years.

A soldier fighting for the moderate faction of Ctrigal, a country plunged into a civil war against extremists who want the country to return to war. Not sure what to do with his money, he decided to use the service of Auto Memory Dolls to write letters for his parents and his childhood friend Maria.

A young woman who is assisted by Violet to debut into high society. She once lived in squalor as Amy Bartlett with her younger foster sister Taylor until she was found by a man claiming to be her father. Initially aloof to Violet, the two women become friends after learning of each other's backstories. However, she becomes reclusive sometime after Violet leaves until she receives an emotional letter from Taylor.

A young girl who was taken in by Amy Bartlett. When Amy is forced to leave her behind, Taylor is sent to the orphanage. After receiving a letter from Amy, by then going under the name Isabella York, she tracks down Violet a few years later to become a mail courier but also to reunite with Amy once more.

Media

Light novels
Violet Evergarden is a Japanese light novel series written by Kana Akatsuki and illustrated by Akiko Takase. Published by Kyoto Animation under their KA Esuma Bunko imprint, from December 25, 2015 to March 28, 2020.

Anime
The anime adaptation was first announced via a commercial of the light novel's first volume in May 2016. In June 2017, Kyoto Animation announced that Anime Expo, AnimagiC, and C3 AFA Singapore 2017 would host the world premiere of the first episode. The second episode was first screened at the KyoAni and Do Fan Days 2017 event on October 21, 2017, and the third episode in five theaters across Japan on December 10, 2017. The 13-episode anime aired from January 11 to April 5, 2018, in Japan. An original video animation episode was released on July 4, 2018, with the final Blu-ray and DVD volume. The series is directed by Taichi Ishidate at Kyoto Animation with the screenplay written by Reiko Yoshida. Akiko Takase designed the characters and Yota Tsuruoka handles the sound direction. Netflix began streaming the series worldwide on January 11, 2018, except for the United States and Australia, where they began streaming on April 5, 2018. Anime Limited acquired the series for home video distribution in the United Kingdom and Ireland, and premiered the first episode at MCM London Comic Con on October 28, 2017. Madman Entertainment acquired the home video distribution rights for the series in Australia and New Zealand.

Films

A spin-off film, premiered on August 3 at Germany's AnimagiC 2019 convention and in Japan on September 6, 2019. The film was directed by the show's series director Haruka Fujita. The film credits feature the names of those killed in the Kyoto Animation arson attack as a dedication to their work. Madman Entertainment licensed the film for distribution in Australia and New Zealand, premiering the film theatrically in Australia on December 5, 2019, and in New Zealand on December 12, 2019. Funimation screened the film theatrically in the United States in early 2020. Anime Limited licensed the film in the UK and Ireland, with a premiere scheduled on March 1, 2020, at the Glasgow Film Festival.

When the Violet Evergarden Gaiden light novel was released, the jacket band announced that a "new project" was in progress and that it will be completely new work for the anime. In July 2018, it was announced at a special event for the series that the aforementioned new project would be a brand new anime film. The second spin-off film, premiered on September 18, 2020. It was originally scheduled to premiere on January 10, 2020, but it was later delayed to April 24, 2020 due to the Kyoto Animation arson attack. It was subsequently delayed again to September 18, 2020 due to the COVID-19 pandemic. The official Kyoto Animation channel uploaded the first 10 minutes of the film on YouTube on October 8, 2020.

Music

The series' soundtrack titled  Violet Evergarden: Automemories was composed by Evan Call and distributed by Bandai Namco Arts under their Lantis label on March 28, 2018. It contains 47 tracks and 6 vocal tracks featuring performances by Aira Yuuki, Minori Chihara, and True.

Track listing
All music/lyrics/tracks are composed and performed by Evan Call, except where indicated.

Reception

Light novel
Violet Evergarden won the grand prize in the fifth Kyoto Animation Award's novel category in 2014, the first ever work to win a grand prize in any of the three categories (novel, scenario, and manga).

Anime

Notes

References

External links
  
  (Anime television series)
  
 

2015 Japanese novels
Anime and manga based on light novels
Coming-of-age anime and manga
Crunchyroll Anime Awards winners
Funimation
KA Esuma Bunko
Kyoto Animation
Light novels
Netflix original anime
Novels about postal systems
Steampunk anime and manga
Television shows based on light novels
Tokyo MX original programming
Works about disability